Arabs in Bulgaria are the people from Arab countries, particularly Lebanon, Syria, the Palestinian Territories, Iraq, and Jordan and also small groups from Egypt, Algeria, Tunisia, Morocco, Libya and Sudan, who emigrated from their native nations and currently reside in Bulgaria. Most Arab Bulgarians are of Lebanese or Syrian origin, because they were the first Arabs to arrive in Bulgaria. The first Arabs came to Bulgaria in the late 1960s and early 1970s as students in Bulgarian universities. In the over forty-year history of this community, 11,400 Arabs have migrated to Bulgaria. According to other data from two teams of anthropologists and sociologists, the number of Arabs in Bulgaria who are legal residents and officially have work permits was 17,000 in 2004. (the number 17,000 includes not only Arabs but also Kurds, Afghans, Berber and others.)

In addition, Bulgaria has people from Arab countries, who have the status of refugees (refugees of the Syrian civil war, but only 10% of them are Syrian Arabs, the other 90% of them are Syrian Kurds) or illegal immigrants trying to immigrate to Western Europe.

Notable people

 Samir Ayass
 Nidal Algafari
 Hodor Fakih
 Ashraf Al Hajuj
 Eyad Hammoud
 Dani Kiki
 Yasin Mishaui
 Bashar Rahal
 Carla Rahal
 Lia Saad, Miss Lebanon Emigrant 2014

See also
Immigration to Bulgaria
Demographics of Bulgaria
Immigration to Europe
Arab diaspora
Arabs in Europe
Bulgarians in Lebanon
List of countries by immigrant population
List of Lebanese people (Bulgaria)
Islam in Bulgaria
Lebanese diaspora
Syrian diaspora

References

Ethnic groups in Bulgaria
Islam in Bulgaria
 
Arab diaspora in Europe
Muslim communities in Europe
Middle Eastern diaspora in Bulgaria